Thodupuzha Vasanthi was an Indian actress who acted mainly in Malayalam films. She appeared in over 450 movies and also in 16 tele-serials and 100 plays. She was a theater artist, before starting with small roles in movies. Her first full length role was in Kakka in 1982. Some of her most popular films include Yavanika (1982), Poochakkoru Mookkuthi (1984), Nirakkoottu (1985) and Godfather (1991). She was also a dance teacher at Varamani Natyalaya. She underwent treatment for throat cancer before her death on 28 November 2017 at the age of 65.

Personal life 
She was born the second of three children to K. R. Ramakrishnan Nair and P. Pankajakshi Amma at Thodupuzha, Mannakkad, Idukki in 1952. Her father was a theater artist and her mother was a dance teacher. She had an elder sister, Radhamani and a younger brother, Suresh Kumar. She studied at Municipal LP School, Manakkad.  She started acting in her father's drama troupe "Jayabharath". She became a theater artist while she was studying for her pre-university degree. She began her film career through a dance sequence in Dharmakshetra Kurukshetra in 1975 at the age of 16. She first got a character role in Ente Neelakasham in 1979. Actress Adoor Bhavani added "Thodupuzha" as a prefix to her name while they were acting together for a drama, Penal code. She was noted for her performance in 1982 in the film Alolam. Her last film was Ithu Thaanda Police, released in 2016. 

She was married to Rajeendran in 1982. The couple had no children. She managed a dance school named "Varamani Natyalaya".
 She took a break from acting after her father Ramakrishnan Nair was diagnosed with cancer and died in 2007. She came back with the movie Elsamma enna Annkutty at her husband's urging, but she had to stay away again, due to her husband's death in August 2010 and later because of her mother's death. She also suffered from various ailments. She had been battling throat cancer for some time and was admitted to the hospital at Vazhakulam in Ernakulam district on 24 November 2017 as her condition worsened. She was also suffering from kidney ailment, and one of her legs had to be amputated. She died on 28 November 2017 due to multiple organ failure. Her funeral took place at Thodupuzha.

Awards
 2012 [Kerala Film Critics Association Awards] - Chalachithra Prathiba Award
 1991 Kerala state drama award for her performance in the theater

Filmography

 Ithu Thaanda Police (2016) as Arundathi's Grandmother
 Parudeesa (2012) as Thresia's mother
 Elsamma Enna Aankutty (2010) as Mary Teacher
 Sketch (2007)
 Ammathottil (2006)
 Vesham (2004) as Sivan's mother
 Kinnara Thumbikal (2000)
 Moksham (1997)
 Vamsham (1997) as Kunjannamma
 Snehasindooram (1997) as Saradha
 Swantham Makalkku Snehapoorvam (1997) 
Kireedamillatha Rajakkanmar (1996)
 Pallivathukkal Thommichen (1996) as Mary
 Malayala Masam Chingam Onninu (1996) as Rukku's mother
 Shashinaas (1995)
 Thirumanassu (1995)
 Thumbolikadappuram (1995)
 Vrudhanmare Sookshikkuka (1995)
 Tharavaadu (Chathurvarnyam) (1994)
 Sukham Sukhakaram (1994)
 Ippadikkum Kaadhal (Tamil) (1994)
 Shudhamaddalam (1994)
Varanamalyam (1994)
 Vakkeel Vasudev (1993) as Jathikka Janu
 Uppukandam Brothers (1993) as Ananthan Pillai's Wife
 Aalavattam (1993)
 Ponnuchami (1993) as Narayani
 Bandhukkal Sathrukkal (1993) as Charumathi
 Ponnuchami (1993) as Kanakam's mother
 Nakshathrakkoodaaram (1992) as Manohar's mother
 First Bell (1992) as Ayamanam Ammini
 Maanthrikacheppu (1992) as Padmavathi
 Pandu Pandoru Rajakumari (1992) as Ammini
 Radhachakram (1992) as Chanchalakshi
 Soorya Gayathri (1992) as Nurse
 Poochakkaru Mani Kettum (1992) as  Lakshmikutty
 Kallanum Polisum (1992) as Narayani
 Kingini (1992) as Kalyani
 Sadayam (1992)
 Avarude Sanketham (1992)
 Post Box Number 27 (1991)
 Irikku MD Akathundu (1991) as Suresh's mother
 Godfather (1991) as Gopinathan's wife
 Nagarathil Samsara Vishayam (1991) as Bharathi
 Poonthenaruvi Chuvannu (1991)
 Mimics Parade (1991)
 Sundarikakka (1991) as Mary John
 Innathe Program (1991) as Unni's mother
 Kuruppinte Kanakkupusthakam (1990) as Rajamma
 Ee Thanutha Veluppan Kalathu(1990) as Vasudev's mother
 Pandu Pandoru Rajakumari (1990) as Ammini 
 Arhatha (1990) as Sreenivasan's wife
 Oliyambukal (1990) as Usha's mother
 Ammayude Swantham Kunju Mary (1990) as Mariya
 Anagha (1989)
 Mahayanam (1989) as Nurse
 Bhadrachitta (1989)
 Ammavanu Pattiya Amali (1989)
 Pooram (1989)
 Padippura (1989)
 VIP (1989) as Maheshwari
 Varnatheru (1989) as Nun
 Season (1989) as Salomi
 Unnikrishnante Adyathe Christmas (1988) as Sophia
 Mrithunjayam (1988) as Robin's mother
 Puraavrutham (1988)
 Vellanakalude Nadu (1988) as Soudamini
 Mukthi (1988) as Radhika's mother
 Mukunthetta Sumitra Vilikkunnu (1988) as Kumaran's wife
 Pattanapravesham (1988) as Devaki
 1921 (1988)
 Ithrayum Kaalam (1987) as Ammukutty
 Kayyethum Doorathu (1987)
 Mangalya Charthu (1987) as Gracy
 Kadhakku Pinnil (1987) as Hostel warden
 Naalkkavala (1987) as Jaanamma
 Vrutham(1987) as Janaki
 Chanthayil Choodi Vilkkunna Pennu (1987)
 Naaradan Keralathil (1987) as Saramma
 Katturumbinum Kaathukuthu (1986)
 T. P. Balagopalan M.A. (1986)
 Ponnum Kudthinu Pottu (1986)
 Aayiram Kannukal (1986) as Hostel warden
 Adiverukal (1986) as Thresia
 Doore Doore Oru Koodu Koottam (1986) as Nambiar's wife
 Iniyum Kurukshetram (1986) as Bhagya Lakshmi
 Nandi Veendum Varika (1986)
 Ninnishtam Ennishtam (1986)
 Sayam Sandhya (1986)
 Pranamam (1986)
 Padayani (1986)
 Oru Katha Oru Nuna Katha (1986)
 Kochu Themmadi (1986)
 Kshamichu Ennoru Vakku (1986)
 Akalangalil (1986) as Nun
 Niramulla Ravukal (1986) as Saradha's mother
 Kunjattakilikal (1986) as Madhavi
 Sanmanassullavarkku Samadhanam (1986) as Ayisha
 Ilanjippookkal (1986)
 Kayyum Thalayum Purathidaruthu (1985) as Vanitha Member
 Ente Ammu Ninte Thulasi Avarude Chakki(1985)
 Ayanam (1985) as Varkey's wife 
 Nirakkoottu (1985) as Sasikala's co-worker
 Onningu Vannenkil as Savithriamma
 Idanilangal (1985) as Jaanu 
 Onnaanaam Kunnil Oradikkunnil (1985) as Shobha's mother
 Gaayathridevi Ente Amma (1985) as Hostel warden
 Akkare Ninnoru Maran (1985) as Parvathi
 Oru Kudakkeezhil (1985) as Saraswathi
 Anubandham (1985) as Padma
 Ee Lokam Ivide Kure Manushyar (1985) as Vasumathi
 Kandu Kandarinju (1985) as Hostel warden
 Vellarikkaappattanam (1985)
 Katha Ithuvare (1985)
 Angadikkappurathu (1985) as Beevi
 Akkacheede Kunjuvava (1985)
 Ambada Njaane (1985) as Padmavathi
 Sreekrishna Parunthu (1984)
 Enganeyundashaane (1984) as Radhika
 Aashamsakalode (1984) as Narayani
 Poochakkoru Mookkuthi (1984) as Kousalya
 Athirathram (1984)
 Chakkarayumma (1984) as Nun
 Raajavembala (1984) as Philomina
 Koottinilamkili (1984) as Office Staff
 Odaruthammava Aalariyam (1984)
 Oru Thettinte Katha (1984)
 Unaroo (1984)
 Oru Swakaaryam (1983) as Vasanthi
 Himavahini (1983) as Hema's sister
 Karyam Nissaram (1983) as Kumar's sister
 Iniyenkilum (1983) as Narayani
Mouna Raagam (1983) as Devaki/Neena's mother
 Lekhayude Maranam Oru Flashback (1983) as Vasanthi
 Sairandri (1983)
 Novemberinte Nashtam (1982)
 Idavela (1982)
 Snehapoorvam Meera (1982) as Saraswathi
 Njanonnu Parayatte (1982)
 Alolam (1982) as Janaki
 Yavanika (1982) as Rajamma
 Kakka (1982)
 Theekadal (1980) as Nurse
  Mr. Michael (1980)
 Mamankam (1979)
 Ente Neelakasham (1979)
 Sukhathine Pinnale (1979)
 Avalude Prathikaram (1979)
 Mochanam (1979) as Reetha
Ivide Kattinu Sugandam (1979) as Sarojam
 Kadathanattu Makkam (1978)
 Sthree Oru Dhukham (1978)
 Abhinivesham (1977)
 Kannapanunni (1977)
 Chennay Valarthiya Kutty (1976)
 Dharmakshetre Kurukshetre (1975) as Dancer

Drama/Dance Dramas
 Jnana Sundari
 Sivathandavam 
 Nalla Thanka
 Gitopadesham
 Ekalavyan

Album
 Davudheente Sandhithi

Television Serials
 Muttathi Varkey Kathakal
 Sthree (Asianet)
 Sthree 2
 Sthree 3
 Annankunjinu Thannalayathu (Surya TV)
 Pachupilla Athava Govindan Pilla

References

External links

https://www.youtube.com/watch?v=tZtYN7Ufhpg
http://www.malayalamcinema.com/star-details.php?member_id=374
http://www.malayalachalachithram.com/profiles.php?i=7260
http://entertainment.oneindia.in/celebs/thodupuzha-vasanthi.html
Thodupuzha Vasanthi at MSI

1952 births
2017 deaths
Actresses in Malayalam cinema
Indian film actresses
Actresses from Kerala
Indian stage actresses
Actresses in Malayalam theatre
20th-century Indian actresses
21st-century Indian actresses
Actresses in Malayalam television